Terminology is the study of terms and their use.

Terminology may also refer to:

Terminology (software), a terminal emulator for the X Window System and for the Wayland graphic server
Terminology science, a branch of linguistics studying special vocabulary

See also

Terminology planning policy
Terminology model
Terminology extraction